Mark Rosenthal may refer to:

 Mark C. Rosenthal, American business executive
 Mark Rosenthal (screenwriter), American screenwriter and film director
 Mark Moisevich Rosenthal (1906–1975), Soviet writer and teacher
 Márk Rosenthal or Rózsavölgyi (1787–1848), Hungarian violinist and composer

See also
 Marc Rosenthal, American singer and songwriter performing as Milton